Orita may refer to:

Orița M1941, Romanian World War II submachine gun named after Captain Marin Orița 
Orita Hiraochi (1847–1905), Japanese politician
Masaki Orita (born 1942), Japanese lawyer 
Shōgo Orita (born 1989), Japanese professional shogi player

See also
Oritae, ancient Greek tribe of the sea-coast of Gedrosia